Alula, also spelled Aluula, is a coastal town in the northeastern Bari region and is part of the autonomous state of Puntland, on the coast of the Guardafui Channel. In the late 19th and early 20th centuries, it served as the main capital of the Majeerteen Sultanate. It is ten miles east of Ras Filuk and 100 nautical miles from Bender Cassim.

Etymology
Alula is derived from the Somali term "lul", which means pearl.

Overview

Adjacent to Alula is a shallow lagoon lined by mangrove bushes, which appears to correspond with the "large laurel-grove called Acannae" also described by the Periplus. The Acrocephalus warbler has been heard singing in the coastal mangroves as well.
On the coastal plain 20 km to Alula's east are ruins of an ancient monument in a platform style. The structure is formed by a rectangular drystone wall that is low in height; the space in between is filled with rubble and manually covered with small stones. Relatively large standing stones (menhirs) are also positioned on the edifice's corners. Near the platform are graves, which are outlined in stones. 24 m by 17 m in dimension, the structure is the largest of a string of ancient platform and enclosed platform monuments exclusive to far northeastern Somalia.

Legendary Arab explorer Ahmad ibn Mājid wrote of Alula and a few other notable ports and landmarks of the northern Somali coast, including Berbera, Siyara, Heis, and Zeila with its Archipelago, Ruguda, Maydh, El-Sheikh and El-Darad .

During the mid-1800s to early 1900s, Alula served as the main capital of the siwaakhroon Majeerteen clan. A castle built in the city  siwaakhroon Majeerten is one of a number of local remains from this era.

In the post-independence period, Alula became the principal town in the Alula District, situated in the autonomous Puntland state.

On April 8, 2013, the Puntland government announced the creation of a new region coextensive with Cape Guardafui named Gardafu. Carved out of Bari, it consists of three districts and has its capital at Alula. The new region was officially approved by legislators on July 20, 2013, during the 30th session of the Puntland parliament.

Education
Alula has a number of academic institutions. According to the Puntland Ministry of Education, there are 11 primary schools in the Alula District. Among these are Xabo, Geesaley, Murcanyo, Xoogad and Alula Primary.

Transportation
Air transportation in Alula is served by the Alula Airport.

According to the Somali government, the town has a small seaport.

Climate
Alula has a hot desert climate (Köppen climate classification BWh).

Notable residents
 Suwaakhron (ciise Cawlyahan) of the Majeerteen

Notes

References

Caluula

Populated places in Bari, Somalia
Categories: Cities of the Majeerteen Sultanate